Lapyrium, or lapirium, as the chloride salt lapirium chloride (INN) or lapyrium chloride (USAN), is a cationic surfactant that is used in personal care products as a biocide and antistatic agent.  It is also used in waste-water treatment and corrosion inhibition formulations.  It is primarily used as the chloride salt, lapyrium chloride.

Related disinfectants

Undecoylium chloride (Emulsept) is a mixture of closely related chemical compounds, used as a disinfectant, in which lapyrium is the major component.  In addition, its complex with iodine, undecoylium chloride-iodine (Virac), is used similarly.

References

Antiseptics
Disinfectants
Cosmetics chemicals